Cecilia Strada (born 12 March 1979) is an Italian philanthropist and essayist, and a former president of the NGO Emergency, which provides free medical treatment to the victims of war, poverty and land mines.

Life 
The only daughter of Gino Strada and Teresa Sarti Strada, Cecilia Strada graduated in sociology at the University of Milano-Bicocca. At the age of thirty years, on 21 December 2009, she was elected president of Emergency in place of her mother, who had died the previous September. She held this position until July 2017.

She is married to Maso Notarianni and has a son.

On 27 June 2021 she announced that she was bisexual.

Career 
Internationally engaged, she followed the activities of the various hospitals of the Emergency organization and took care of their relations at the local level, as well as testifying to her experience as journalist and on media.

She supports the need for a change in international relations and the need to link the network of commercial relationships with respect for human rights.

In 2018 she received the National Culture of Peace Award "for the many activities carried out, for her social work within an association, as well as for the work of information, counter-information and testimony regarding theaters of war and the possible solutions to be adopted. All this has allowed and allows many to know complex realities, to open up different horizons and to create spaces of decisive commitment for the progress of society".

Citations

Sources

External links 

 Official website of Emergency

1979 births
Living people
Italian philanthropists